The 1967 Oakland Raiders season was the team's eighth in Oakland. Under the command of second-year head coach John Rauch, the Raiders went , an American Football League (AFL) record, and captured their first Western Division title, four games ahead of runner-up Kansas City, the defending league champion.

The addition of strong-armed quarterback Daryle Lamonica greatly energized the Raiders' vertical passing game. Additionally, the Raiders added Gene Upshaw, Willie Brown, and George Blanda to their roster as well as linebackers coach (and future head coach) John Madden prior to the 1967 season. All four were later elected to the Pro Football Hall of Fame.

The Raiders routed the visiting Houston Oilers in the AFL championship game on New Year's Eve.

Offseason

1967 AFL draft

Roster

Team leaders
Passing
Daryle Lamonica – 3,228 yds., 30 TD, 20 INT, 80.8 rating
Rushing
Clem Daniels – 130 att., 575 yds., 4 TD
Receiving
Fred Biletnikoff – 40 rec., 876 yds., 5 TD

Regular season
Over the course of a fourteen-game regular season schedule, the Raiders faced six of the other eight AFL teams twice, with one game against the Eastern Division's Houston Oilers and Miami Dolphins. The AFL's only scheduled playoff was the championship game between the two division winners. A playoff round was added two years later, in its final season.

Postseason

Standings

Game summaries

Week 1 vs Broncos

With only one game played during the AFL's opening week, the Raiders' season began on September 10, 1967, with a 51–0 wipeout of the Denver Broncos in front of a home crowd of just more than 25,000.  Running back Hewritt Dixon caught one touchdown pass and ran for another.  Warren Powers capped the scoring with a 36-yard interception return for a touchdown.

Week 2

Newly acquired quarterback Daryle Lamonica threw three touchdowns and ran for another as Oakland's high-powered offense easily handled the Boston Patriots.  Former Raiders quarterback Babe Parilli connected with Art Graham on a 19-yard touchdown pass for Boston's only score.

Week 3

The Raiders stayed undefeated on the young season on the strength of two Daryle Lamonica touchdown passes and three field goals from 40-year-old George Blanda.  A late touchdown run by Mike Garrett was not enough for Kansas City, who lost their first game of the season.

Week 4

In front of a crowd of more than 63,000 at Shea Stadium, the New York Jets spoiled Oakland's perfect season.  New York's running game provided three touchdowns—two by Emerson Boozer and one by Bill Mathis.  Daryle Lamonica connected with Bill Miller and Warren Wells for two second-half touchdowns.

Week 5

Oakland rebounded from the previous week's defeat by edging the Buffalo Bills in War Memorial Stadium.  The Raiders built a 17–7 halftime lead on a George Blanda field goal, a Fred Biletnikoff touchdown catch, and a 30-yard interception return for a touchdown by Dan Conners. Daryle Lamonica found Billy Cannon for a 3-yard touchdown in the fourth quarter, which provided the margin of victory.

Week 6

In a Week 3 rematch at Fenway Park the Raiders once again easily defeated the Patriots.  Daryle Lamonica threw for four touchdowns, while George Blanda accounted for one touchdown pass and two field goals.  Roger Hagberg caught one touchdown and ran for another for Oakland.

Week 7

Oakland broke the 50-point mark for the second time in 1967, as the Raiders crushed the San Diego Chargers in their first meeting of the season.  Daryle Lamonica and George Blanda combined for three touchdown passes, while Lamonica ran for two more scores.  Lance Alworth caught a 71-yard touchdown for the Chargers.

Week 8

Oakland held off a late comeback by the Broncos to preserve a narrow victory at Bears Stadium.  The Raiders built an 18–7 halftime lead on the strength of two touchdown receptions by Bill Miller, but could only manage one field goal in the second half.  Jim LeClair ran for a 1-yard Denver touchdown in the final period.

Week 9

The Raiders scored 17 points in the final period to pull away from the expansion Miami Dolphins.  Daryle Lamonica connected with Billy Cannon for three scores, while Clem Daniels ran for another.  Bob Griese threw a 5-yard touchdown pass to tight end Doug Moreau in the second quarter to give the Dolphins a three-point lead at halftime.

Week 10

Oakland improved to 9–1 by doubling up on the Chiefs in front of more than 44,000 in Municipal Stadium.  Five different Raiders (Fred Biletnikoff, Willie Brown, Pete Banaszak, Warren Powers, and Larry Todd) scored touchdowns, while the Chiefs got touchdown receptions from Frank Pitts and Otis Taylor.

Week 11

The Raiders' offense continued to pile up points on the season, as Daryle Lamonica threw for four more touchdowns.  Billy Cannon caught two, while Bill Miller and Fred Biletnikoff caught one each.  Charger quarterback John Hadl passed for two scores and ran for another.

Week 12

Four George Blanda field goals and a 27-yard touchdown run by Hewritt Dixon lifted Oakland to its eleventh win of the season, while the Raiders defense held the Houston Oilers to just one touchdown.  The game was played at Rice Stadium.

Week 13

The Raiders avenged their only loss of the season in front of a home crowd of 53,011.  The Jets scored first on a 28-yard pass from Joe Namath to Don Maynard.  Daryle Lamonica threw for three touchdowns, while Roger Hagberg and Hewritt Dixon ran for one touchdown each.

Week 14

A 6-yard touchdown run by Hewritt Dixon broke a 21–21 tie in the fourth quarter, as the Raiders edged the Bills to end their regular season with a 13–1 mark, the best in franchise history.  The Oakland defense capitalized on Buffalo turnovers, converting two fumble recoveries into touchdowns in the second and third quarters.  Daryle Lamonica found Billy Cannon for a 23-yard touchdown pass in the first period.

Regular season team statistics
In the 1967 regular season, the defense led the league with 67 sacks and 665 yards lost, the latter still an all-time record, the Raiders leading the league in sacks from 1966 to 1968, also an all-time record.

Postseason
With a 13–1 record, the Raiders captured their first AFL Western Division title and advanced to the 1967 AFL Championship against the Eastern Division champion Houston Oilers.  Oakland edged Houston in a Week 15 matchup on December 10.  By virtue of the game's annual rotation, the game was played in Oakland.

AFL championship game

Super Bowl II

Scoring summary
GB – FG Chandler 39
GB – FG Chandler 20
GB – Dowler 62 pass from Starr (Chandler kick)
OAK – Miller 23 pass from Lamonica (Blanda kick)
GB – FG Chandler 43
GB – Anderson 2 run  (Chandler kick)
GB – FG Chandler 31
GB – Adderley 60 interception return (Chandler kick)
OAK – Miller 23 pass from Lamonica (Blanda kick)

Sources
1967 Oakland Raiders at databaseFootball.com
SI Vault
NFL team records

References

American Football League championship seasons
Oakland Raiders seasons
Oakland
Oakland